Rediviva is a genus of bees in the Melittidae family endemic to South Africa.

Species

 Rediviva albifasciata Whitehead & Steiner, 1994
 Rediviva alonsoae Whitehead & Steiner, 2001
 Rediviva aurata Whitehead & Steiner, 2001
 Rediviva bicava Whitehead & Steiner, 2001
 Rediviva colorata Michener, 1981
 Rediviva emdeorum Vogel & Michener, 1985
 Rediviva gigas Whitehead & Steiner, 1993
 Rediviva intermedia Whitehead & Steiner, 2001
 Rediviva intermixta (Cockerell, 1934)
 Rediviva longimanus Michener, 1981
 Rediviva macgregori Whitehead & Steiner, 2001
 Rediviva micheneri Whitehead & Steiner, 2001
 Rediviva neliana Cockerell, 1931
 Rediviva nitida Whitehead & Steiner, 2001
 Rediviva pallidula Whitehead & Steiner, 1992
 Rediviva parva Whitehead & Steiner, 2001
 Rediviva peringueyi (Friese, 1911)
 Rediviva ruficornis Whitehead & Steiner, 2001
 Rediviva rufipes (Friese, 1913)
 Rediviva rufocincta (Cockerell, 1934)
 Rediviva saetigera Whitehead & Steiner, 1992
 Rediviva tropicalis (Cockerell, 1934)

References

External links 
 Discover Life
 Waspweb

Bee genera
Melittidae